The men's indoor hockey tournament at the 2017 Southeast Asian Games was held from 21 to 26 August in Malaysia. In this tournament, 6 Southeast Asian teams played in the men's competition.

All matches were played at MATRADE Exhibition and Convention Centre in Segambut.

Competition schedule
The following was the competition schedule for the men's indoor hockey competitions:

Participating nations
The following six teams participated for the men's competition.

  (INA)
  (MAS)
  (PHI)
  (SGP)
  (THA)
  (VIE)

Draw
There was no official draw since only 6 teams participating in this competition. All teams are automatically drawn to one group.

Results 
All times are Malaysia Standard Time (UTC+8).

Group stage

Classification round

Fifth place game

Bronze medal match

Gold medal match

Final standings

See also
Indoor hockey at the 2017 Southeast Asian Games – Women's tournament

References

External links
Official website

Indoor hockey at the 2017 Southeast Asian Games